Anthony Burke (born 1966) is an Australian political theorist and international relations scholar. He is Professor of Politics and International Relations at the University of New South Wales.

He was the founding editor and is publisher of the transdisciplinary journal of the humanities and social sciences, Borderlands.

His published work ranges across the fields of environmental politics, science and technology studies, security studies, war and peace, international ethics, the international relations of the Asia-Pacific and the Middle-East, and Australian politics and history.

He is the author of four books: Uranium (Polity, 2017), Ethics and Global Security: A Cosmopolitan Approach (with Katrina Lee-Koo and Matt McDonald, Routledge 2014), Beyond Security, Ethics and Violence: War Against The Other (Routledge, 2007), and Fear of Security: Australia’s Invasion Anxiety (Pluto Press Australia, 2001; 2nd. edn. Cambridge University Press, 2008). He is the co-editor of Ethical Security Studies: A New Research Agenda (with Jonna Nyman, Routledge 2016), Global Insecurity: Futures of Global Chaos and Governance (with Rita Parker, Palgrave, 2017), and Critical Security in the Asia-Pacific (with Matthew McDonald, Manchester University Press, 2007).

Key shorter works include "Planet Politics: A Manifesto from the end of IR" (Millennium, 2016), "Security Cosmopolitanism" (Critical Studies on Security, 2013), "Humanity After Biopolitics" (Angelaki, 2011), "Ontologies of War" (Theory & Event, 2006), and "Aporias of Security" (Alternatives, 2002).

Education and career

Anthony Burke received a B.A. (Communications) in 1991 and M.A. by thesis in 1994 from the University of Technology Sydney, where he also tutored and lectured. He studied journalism, creative writing, cultural theory and politics under teachers and intellectuals such as the literary theorist Stephen Muecke, sociologists Jean Martin and Caroline Graham, novelist Amanda Lohrey, semiologist Gunther Kress, media theorists Helen Wilson and McKenzie Wark and historians John Docker and Ann Curthoys. His fellow students included writers such as Claire Corbett, Lindsay Barrett, Fiona Allon, Bernard Cohen, Justine Ettler and Anthony Macris. During this time, until the mid-1990s, he also worked as a human rights activist with campaigns for East Timor, Bougainville, West Papua and Indonesia. In 1991-2 he was a researcher in telecommunications law and policy at the Communications Law Centre, UNSW.

He was awarded a PhD in Political Science and International Relations from the Australian National University in 1999, and subsequently worked in the Australian Senate as a committee researcher on the environment, arts and communications. Whilst there he led a research team on the Senate's 2000 report, The Heat is On: Australia’s Greenhouse Future.

He was appointed to a lectureship at the University of Queensland in 2001 and left to join the University of Adelaide in July that year. In 2005 he joined the University of New South Wales in Sydney, where he was promoted to Associate Professor in 2007, and in 2008 transferred to its college at the Australian Defence Force Academy in Canberra, Australia's capital.

Writing and Approach

Burke has published four authored books, and a number of journal articles and essays, including an essay on biopolitics and the war on terror, "Life in the hall of smashed mirrors", which used a fictional form.

His conceptual approach is a hybrid of poststructuralist themes (Derrida, Foucault, Lyotard, Butler and Agamben), post-colonial theory (Said) and post-Kantian critical theory (from Frankfurt School figures such as Horkheimer, Habermas and Fromm, to harder to classify thinkers like Arendt, Levinas, Buber, Heller, Heidegger). Within the field of International Relations, his approach would be known as that of a "critical constructivist", and it does not fit easily into established theoretical "camps". More recently, his work on nuclear politics, security studies and environmental politics has drawn strongly on new materialist and post-humanist thinking.

Burke's first book, In Fear of Security: Australia's Invasion Anxiety, developed a theory of security as a 'political technology' with an historical account of how security has been defined, sought and mobilized throughout Australian history. It has a particular emphasis on Australia's policy towards Indonesia and the Asia-Pacific. Its second edition includes a chapter on Australia's repression and exclusion of asylum seekers, and its involvement in the US-led war on terror, and a new conclusion setting out a cosmopolitan future for Australia. While describing a more hopeful and progressive vision of Australian politics and foreign policy (in sympathy with broad notions of human security, or the Welsh School's emancipatory approach to critical security studies), its detailed empirical account of how security has functioned as a tool of the powerful in Australian history, at the same time as denying security and dignity to millions, challenges both conservative and progressive visions of security.

His second book, Beyond Security, Ethics and Violence: War Against the Other, combined political philosophy with a range of empirical studies: Israel/Palestine, the War on Terror, American exceptionalism, the Iraq and Vietnam wars, and the Australia-Indonesia relationship during the dictatorship of Soeharto. It develops his critical theory of security across three chapters, a further three chapters interrogate dominant ethical approaches to national security, especially just war theory, and the final three chapters question the constitutive and dysfunctional role of violence in world politics, finding its claims linked closely with modern ideas of strategy, progress and freedom. The book includes critical engagements with the writings of Giorgio Agamben, Michel Foucault, William E. Connolly, Michael Hardt and Antonio Negri, Emmanuel Levinas, and Martin Buber.

More recently he has begun to publish works in the fields of critical terrorism studies, and strategic studies, including essays defining the field of critical terrorism studies, on the philosophy of war, terrorism and the use of force, and nuclear strategic reason and disarmament.

Burke has also begun to publish work engaging with Cosmopolitanism in international relations, philosophy and political theory, which is pursued in a way that is both critical and transformative of more liberal notions of the cosmopolitan. There he develops a distinctive empirical-normative justification for it, a new relational ontology to ground its claims and practices, and rejects a teleological vision of change.

In 2013 this direction moved into International Security Studies, with the publication of his theory of "Security Cosmopolitanism" in the inaugural issue of Critical Studies on Security. Arguing that the realities of globalisation and the biosphere had made the classical model of the state (as a contained and sovereign "body-politic" that can immunise itself from external threats) both retrograde and dangerous, he proposed a new paradigm of security theory and practice that would radically transform both national and collective security practices and grapple with the way global insecurities emerge from with states and the structural practices and systems of modernity. This theory frames the 2014 book co-authored with Katrina Lee-Koo and Matt McDonald, Ethics and Global Security: A Cosmopolitan Approach.

Controversy

In 2008, following the publication of an article in the new journal, Critical Studies on Terrorism, Burke was criticised by neo-conservative intellectuals in Australia. This dispute quickly attracted national media attention.

A Queensland university lecturer, Mervyn Bendle, writing in the magazine Quadrant, accused Burke and a number of other writers of supporting and apologizing for terrorism in their works. He also criticized Burke's teaching appointment to UNSW at the Australian Defence Force Academy as inappropriate. Bendle wrote that Burke had an "abstract and tendentious postmodernist perspective", and that "one gets an impression not only of the "radical pacifism" deplored by Ungerer, but of a deeper, almost pathological tendency revealed in Burke's antipathy for liberal democracies and mainstream Australians, and his relentless sympathy for terrorists, illegal immigrants, communists, and "the Other" in its multitudinous forms". Bendle also repeated these views on ABC Radio National's Religion Report and in The Australian.

Burke responded by stating that he was neither a pacifist nor a supporter of terrorism, and stressed that his work "has been about trying to make liberal democracy better, better at living up to its own values and protecting the freedoms that are proclaimed so loudly about". He emphasized that he had consistently "condemned terrorism as an immoral, illegitimate and politically counter-productive form of violence". He responded to the claims in an interview on ABC Radio National and his scholarship on terrorism was profiled in The Australian's Higher Education Supplement.

Selected works 

Books

Uranium (Polity Press, 2017).here

Ethics and Global Security: A Cosmopolitan Approach (with Katrina Lee-Koo and Matt McDonald, Routledge, 2014).here

Fear of Security: Australia’s Invasion Anxiety (Cambridge University Press, 2008 and Pluto Press Australia, 2001).here

Beyond Security, Ethics and Violence: War Against The Other (Routledge, 2007).here

Articles

"Planet Politics: A Manifesto from the end of IR", with Stefanie Fishel, Audra Mitchell, Simon Dalby and Daniel J. Levine, Millennium, Vol. 33 No. 3, 2016.

"Security Cosmopolitanism", Critical Studies on Security, Vol. 1 No. 1, 2013.

"Humanity After Biopolitics: On the Global Politics of Human Being", Angelaki: Journal of the Theoretical Humanities, Vol. 16 No. 4, 2011.

"Nuclear Reason: At the Limits of Strategy", International Relations, Vol. 23 No. 4, December 2009.

"Life in the Hall of Smashed Mirrors", Borderlands, Vol. 7 No. 1, 2008, and Meanjin Quarterly, Vol. 67 No. 4, December 2008.

"The End of Terrorism Studies", Critical Studies on Terrorism, Vol. 1 No. 1, 2008.

"Ontologies of War: Violence, Existence, and Reason", Theory & Event, Vol. 10 No. 2, July 2007.

"Cause and Effect in the War on Terror", in Alex J. Bellamy, Roland Bleiker, Sara E. Davies and Richard Devetak eds. Security and the War on Terror (Routledge, 2007).here

"Against The New Internationalism", Ethics & International Affairs, Vol. 19 No. 2, Summer 2005. (With a response by Jean Bethke Elshtain, "Against the New Utopianism")here

"Just War or Ethical Peace? Moral Discourses of Strategic Violence after 9/11", International Affairs, Vol. 80 No. 2, March 2004.

"Aporias of Security", Alternatives: Global, Local, Political, Vol. 27 No. 1, Jan–Mar 2002.

References

External links 
UNSW Biography: http://hass.unsw.adfa.edu.au/staff/profiles/burke.html
 

1966 births
Living people
Australian political scientists
University of Technology Sydney alumni
Academic staff of the University of New South Wales
Security studies
International relations scholars
Australian National University alumni